Betim Halimi (born 28 February 1996) is a Kosovan professional footballer who plays as a goalkeeper for Albanian club Kukësi.

Club career

Early career and Drita
Halimi was part of Kosovo First League club Vllaznia Pozheran until 1 February 2016. On 19 January 2016, Telegrafi announced that he is on trial to Chelsea's under-18 team competing in the U18 Premier League, but unfortunately this test turned out to fail. On 1 February 2016, Halimi joined Kosovo Superleague side Drita, to replace the injured Artan Latifi and played 15 matches in the league.

Hajvalia
On 7 July 2016, Halimi joined Kosovo Superleague side Hajvalia. On 21 August 2016, he made his debut in a 4–0 away defeat against Ferizaj after being named in the starting line-up.

Return to Drita
On 30 December 2016, Halimi returned to Kosovo Superleague club Drita and this return would become legally effective two days later. On 26 February 2017, he made his debut in a 1–1 away win against Gjilani after being named in the starting line-up.

Narva Trans
On 13 June 2018, Halimi joined Meistriliiga side Narva Trans. On 21 August 2018, he made his debut with Narva Trans in the 2018–19 Estonian Cup third round against SK Kadrina after being named in the starting line-up. Seven days later, he made his first Meistriliiga appearance after coming on as a substitute at last minutes in place of Artur Kotenko in a 0–3 away win against Kuressaare.

Olimpik Donetsk
On 27 February 2019, Halimi signed a three-and-a-half-year contract with Ukrainian Premier League club Olimpik Donetsk and received squad number 12. Four days later, he made his debut in a 0–1 home defeat against Arsenal Kyiv after being named in the starting line-up.

Prishtina
On 10 August 2021, Halimi signed a three-year contract with Kosovo Superleague club Prishtina. Seven days later, he made his debut with Prishtina in the 2021 Kosovar Supercup against Llapi after being named in the starting line-up.

International career

Under-21
On 21 March 2017, Halimi received a call-up from Kosovo U21 for a 2019 UEFA European Under-21 Championship qualification match against Republic of Ireland U21, he was an unused substitute in that match.

Senior
On 23 December 2019, Halimi confirmed that he received a call-up from Kosovo for a friendly match against Sweden, but due to injury, could not be part of the national team. On 17 March 2021, he received again a call-up from Kosovo for the friendly match against Lithuania and 2022 FIFA World Cup qualification matches against Sweden and Spain, but he was an unused substitute in these matches. On 11 June 2021, Halimi made his debut with Kosovo in a friendly match against Gambia after being named in the starting line-up.

Career statistics

Club

References

External links

1996 births
Living people
People from Viti, Kosovo
Kosovan footballers
Kosovo international footballers
Kosovan expatriate footballers
Expatriate footballers in Estonia
Kosovan expatriate sportspeople in Estonia
Expatriate footballers in Ukraine
Kosovan expatriate sportspeople in Ukraine
Expatriate footballers in Albania
Kosovan expatriate sportspeople in Albania
Association football goalkeepers
Football Superleague of Kosovo players
FC Drita players
KF Hajvalia players
FC Prishtina players
Meistriliiga players
JK Narva Trans players
Ukrainian Premier League players
FC Olimpik Donetsk players
Kategoria Superiore players
FK Kukësi players